The Microbicide Trials Network (MTN) is the leading United States government-funded research organization working in the field of microbicides for sexually transmitted diseases. The MTN particularly focuses on research into microbicides which would prevent HIV infection. The MTN is a member of HANC.

Clinical trials
The MTN's current clinical trial is the Vaginal and Oral Interventions to Control the Epidemic (VOICE) study.

References

External links
 

HIV/AIDS organizations in the United States
Medical and health organizations based in Pennsylvania
Microbicides